The R. L. Anderson House is a Bungalow/Craftman style house located in Kingman, Arizona. The house is listed on the National Register of Historic Places.

It was evaluated for National Register listing as part of a 1985 study of 63 historic resources in Kingman that led to this and many others being listed.

Description 
The R. L. Anderson House is located at 703 Beale Street in Kingman, Arizona. The home was built around  1915 by Lovin & Withers in the Bungalow/Craftman style. It is one of the houses built with brick instead of stone or wood or adobe style. The house  was added to the National Register of Historic Places in 1986 as No. 87001160.

References

Houses completed in 1915
Houses in Kingman, Arizona
Houses on the National Register of Historic Places in Arizona
National Register of Historic Places in Kingman, Arizona
American Craftsman architecture in Arizona